See Jane Date is a 2003 romantic comedy television film directed by Robert Berlinger and starring Charisma Carpenter and Holly Marie Combs. It is based on Melissa Senate's book of the same name, and premiered on ABC Family on August 16, 2003.

Synopsis 
Single, ambitious, magazine assistant editor Jane Grant has just received an invitation to her younger cousin's wedding, and it is engraved with two words: "plus guest." Come wedding day, Jane had better deliver. After all, she's already told everyone, including her meddlesome and obnoxious Aunt Ina and now-famous high school nemesis Natasha Nutley, that she's in a serious relationship. Now, Jane has two months to find a guy to fit the lie, complete the guest list, and save face. If the series of miserable set-ups orchestrated by her well-meaning best friends Eloise and Amanda are any indication, Jane's in for big trouble. From first date to blind date, from double date to last date, the match game is on-and with millions of men to pick from, Jane is sure to find Mr. Right, right?

Cast 
 Charisma Carpenter as Jane Grant
 Holly Marie Combs as Natasha Nutley
 Rachelle Lefevre as Eloise
 Sadie LeBlanc as Amanda
 Antonio Sabato Jr as Timothy Rommelly
 Linda Dano as Aunt Ina
 Joshua Malina as Kevin Adams
 David Lipper as Ethan Miles
 Evan Marriott as Hank Chilton
 Cameron Mathison as Gary Babcock
 Zachary Levi as Grant Asher
 Yannick Bisson as Max Garrett
 Eddie McClintock as Kurt Batner

External links 
 

2003 television films
2003 romantic comedy films
2003 films
ABC Family original films
American romantic comedy films
American comedy television films
Canadian romantic comedy films
Canadian comedy television films
English-language Canadian films
Films set in New York (state)
Films shot in Montreal
Romance television films
2000s American films
2000s Canadian films